Bowling Green is a city in Pike County, Missouri, United States. The population was 5,334 at the 2010 census. It is the county seat of Pike County.

History
Bowling Green was settled in 1819, and designated county seat in 1824. Settled chiefly by migrants from Kentucky and Virginia, it was named after Bowling Green, Kentucky.

The James Beauchamp Clark House was listed on the National Register of Historic Places in 1976.

Geography

Highways
 U.S. Route 54
 U.S. Route 61
 Route 161

Bowling Green lies at the junction of US highways 54 and 61. US 54 links Bowling Green with Illinois to the east and Jefferson City and the Lake of the Ozarks to the south and west, while US 61 connects the city with Hannibal to the north and the St. Louis area to the south.

Climate

Demographics

2010 census
As of the census of 2010, there were 5,334 people, 1,316 households, and 810 families living in the city. The racial makeup of the city was 79.4% White, 18.4% African American, 0.1% Native American, 0.3% Asian, 0.5% from other races, and 1.2% from two or more races. Hispanic or Latino of any race were 1.8% of the population.

There were 1,316 households, of which 35.9% had children under the age of 18 living with them, 38.8% were married couples living together, 16.9% had a female householder with no husband present, 5.9% had a male householder with no wife present, and 38.4% were non-families. 31.9% of all households were made up of individuals, and 13.2% had someone living alone who was 65 years of age or older. The average household size was 2.46 and the average family size was 3.06.

The median age in the city was 35.9 years. 17% of residents were under the age of 18; 11.4% were between the ages of 18 and 24; 35.2% were from 25 to 44; 25.3% were from 45 to 64; and 11.1% were 65 years of age or older. The gender makeup of the city was 66.2% male and 33.8% female.

2000 census
As of the census of 2000, there were 3,260 people, 1,290 households, and 798 families living in the city. The population density was 1,677.0 people per square mile (648.8/km2). There were 1,420 housing units at an average density of 730.5 per square mile (282.6/km2). The racial makeup of the city was 90.64% White, 7.67% African American, 0.12% Native American, 0.18% Asian, 0.21% from other races, and 1.17% from two or more races. Hispanic or Latino of any race were 0.74% of the population.

There were 1,290 households, out of which 32.5% had children under the age of 18 living with them, 42.9% were married couples living together, 14.7% had a female householder with no husband present, and 38.1% were non-families.  32.9% of all households were made up of individuals, and 16.1% had someone living alone who was 65 years of age or older. The average household size was 2.38 and the average family size was 3.03.

In the city, the population was spread out, with 27.2% under the age of 18, 8.6% from 18 to 24, 26.6% from 25 to 44, 19.3% from 45 to 64, and 18.3% who were 65 years of age or older. The median age was 36 years. For every 100 females, there were 85.9 males. For every 100 females age 18 and over, there were 80.6 males.

The median income for a household in the city was $27,287, and the median income for a family was $36,619. Males had a median income of $28,871 versus $18,873 for females. The per capita income for the city was $14,670. About 10.5% of families and 13.1% of the population were below the poverty line, including 14.4% of those under age 18 and 15.6% of those age 65 or over.

Education
Bowling Green R-1 School District operates two elementary schools, one middle school and Bowling Green High School.

The town has a lending library, the Bowling Green Public Library.

Notable residents
James Overton Broadhead, House of Representatives, Missouri Senate, 1st president of the American Bar Association.
Bennett Champ Clark, United States Senator (1933–1945), United States Circuit Judge (1945–1954).
Champ Clark, Speaker of the House of Representatives.
Jack Dougherty, American actor.
Cotton Fitzsimmons, NBA  Coach. 832 wins in the NBA. Naismith Basketball Hall of Fame Class of 2021. Graduated from Bowling Green High School in 1949. 
William L. Hungate, United States Representative (1964–1977), United States federal judge (1979–1992). Graduated from Bowling Green High School in 1940.
Glenn Jacobs, professional wrestler for the WWE, Kane. Mayor of Knox County, Tennessee (2017–present)
Virginia Kirtley, American actress and writer.
Arthur Murray, Major General, United States Army. Years of service: 1878–1915, 1917–1918.
Sterling Price, Major General, 11th Governor of Missouri (1853-1857).
William R. Purnell, United States Admiral. Years of service: 1910–1946.
James Earl Ray, moved with his family to the community from Alton, Illinois at age 2.  At age 7 he moved with his family to Ewing, Missouri.
Raymond Phillips Sanderson, American sculptor and painter.
Genevieve Clark Thomson, American suffragist.

References

External links
 Historic maps of Bowling Green in the Sanborn Maps of Missouri Collection at the University of Missouri

Cities in Pike County, Missouri
County seats in Missouri
Cities in Missouri
1819 establishments in Missouri Territory
Populated places established in 1819